Kenneth Murray (2 April 1928 in Newcastle upon Tyne, England - 1993), was an English footballer who played as a forward in the Football League.

References

External links

1928 births
1993 deaths
20th-century English people
Ashington A.F.C. players
Association football forwards
Bishop Auckland F.C. players
Darlington F.C. players
English footballers
English Football League players
Gateshead F.C. players
Mansfield Town F.C. players
Oldham Athletic A.F.C. players
Footballers from Newcastle upon Tyne
Wrexham A.F.C. players
Date of death missing